is a 1993 Japanese video game developed by the company Gainax. It is the second installment in the Princess Maker series of social simulation games where the player must act as a parental figure and raise a young girl. The player takes role of a War Hero who raises a girl to the age of 18. At the end of the game, the daughter goes into a line of work; what this work is, how much talent she has for it, her marital life, and her overall happiness all depend on the player's actions throughout the game.

After the initial release for the Japanese PC-9801 personal computer, it has been subsequently released for many other personal computers and Video game consoles. The game has been translated into English, Korean, and Chinese.

Story
The game takes place in a fantasy world roughly modeled after medieval Europe with the starting year is given as 1210 K.D. The player's character is a famous warrior who defended the kingdom from an invasion by Lucifon, the Prince of Darkness (a corruption of Lucifer); consequently, he is known throughout the land as a military hero and receives an annual salary from the palace. One night, he receives a communication from a god whose identity is determined by the birth-date the player selects at the beginning of the game. This god bestows upon the mentioned player a child of the heavens, and it is their duty to raise her from the age of 10 to the age of 18, at which point she will enter a line of work; the most desirable outcome is that of a royal princess.

Gameplay 
The daughter has a set of statistics that fluctuate depending on the activities the player assigns to her schedule, including various part-time jobs, schooling, adventure, and free time. It is these statistics that ultimately determine her final occupation, her skill level in her line of work, and her overall happiness in life; her marital fate is also decided, in part, by these statistics. The game also makes use of some invisible statistics to determine the occurrence of certain special events. The player can converse with the girl and she will refer to the player as "father".

The god who visits the father is the daughter's patron god. That patron determines her starting statistics in a way that is loosely related to the god's role in the Roman pantheon; for example, a girl born under Mars begins the game with an advantage in fighting reputation. The player can purchase a pill from a merchant that increases the bust size of the girl. 

The game ends after five and a half hours of gameplay when the girl reaches 18 and chooses a future career. High score are given to jobs such as Queen or general, whereas low scores are given to jobs such as barmaid. The game features 74 possible endings.

Development 

The game was developed by Gainax, who are also known for the anime series Neon Genesis Evangelion and FLCL. The game is part of a trend of idealized real world simulation games in Japan, such as Tokimeki Memorial. In Japan at this time, most child rearing was done by females in the household since the males tended to be more career focused. Designer Takami Akai explained that "To play this game means to do something you want to but can't", adding that a father would not be allowed to manage his daughter's life because they would complain too much. Akai had thought about giving the player an infant to start the game but decided against it.

Release 

The game was first released for the PC-9801 personal computer. By September 1993, the game had sold 30,000 copies and the company had received 10,000 letters from fans. An English language version of the game for DOS was completed but was cancelled in 1996. The version was completed and review copies had been sent out to magazines, however the company producing the English port, IntraCorp, went bankrupt. That version was then subsequently leaked onto the internet, and was sometimes referred to as abandonware. It had later been released for multiple personal computers including the FM Towns, Macintosh, Windows 3.1, Windows 95, Windows Me, as well as many home consoles like the 3DO, Pc engine, Sega Saturn, and PlayStation 2.

In 2001, the first two games in the Princess Maker series were released for the Sega Dreamcast titled Princess Maker Collection. It was ported to Japanese mobile phones in 2005. Along with the original Princess Maker 1, Princess Maker 2 has received a newer "refined" remake for Windows. The graphics are redrawn sound quality of the game have been changed, along with various other elements. Princess Maker 2 Refine was released via Steam in Fall 2016, published by Korean publisher CFK. This version has the option for English, Chinese, Japanese, and Korean language options.

Reception

The game was released to largely critical praise. Next Generation reviewed the PC version of the game, rating it three stars out of five, and stated that "This is the strangest game to hit the U.S. PC market in years, and on a certain level, Ignite should be commended for taking the chance to release it. Whether it can, or maybe even should, find an audience is another matter."

Several reviewers commented on the gender issues of the game. Francesca Reyes writing in Ultra Gameplayers said that while the game does include "thinly veiled sexist allusions", and that it might not be for everyone, it she said the game was highly entertaining and praised the game. In contrast, Etsuko Yamashita, a Women's studies professor at Japan Women's University was critical of the game and likening the content of the game to incest. In regards to the game being popular among college and high school males, she remarked "You might think that the younger generation has a better sense of gender equality, but this game proves it's not necessarily true." 

Many reviewers praised the game for its originality. Guillermo Vacas of Minami 2000 praised it for being a "manga" style gamed, but was non-violent and educational. Chris Hudak writing in Wired magazine, praised the game for breaking the mold of violent video games on PC at the time. Saying that he had grown attached to his virtual daughter, and that the unique gameplay rewards sensitive paternal players. Both Next Generation and Reyes praised the publisher for publishing such a unique game. Reviewers also praised the visuals. PC Zone magazine called the anime styled art as "eye-catching". 

Reviewers also praised the amount of endings in the game,saying that it encouraged playing through the game multiple times.

Although most critics praised the game, some were more critical. While Vacas praised the game as addictive and enjoyable, one downside they noted was its sheer complexity, something that could be daunting for first time players. Three reviewers from Famitsu DC were more critical of the Princess Maker Collection, giving it a low score. They said that the games were simply ports, and that while they were new and innovative at the time, they have since become dated. They said that perhaps Princess Maker: Faery Tales Come True might be an easier to game to play instead. Janine Hawkins, writing in Vice was critical of the look of the Refine version of the game, including the lack of dithering in artwork.

Retrospective reviews of the game were also positive. Reviewing the 2016 English Refine release, Hardcore Gamer gave the game a score of 4 out of 5 and called it "absolutely a blast all these years later", although criticizing the translation, which at times said the opposite of what actually happened or left the endings voiced in Japanese without subtitles.

Notes

References

External links
Princess Maker 2 at MobyGames
SoftEgg Official Site – Priness Maker 2

1993 video games
DOS games
Fantasy video games
Microcabin games
Raising sims
Sega Saturn games
Video game sequels
Video games developed in Japan
Video games featuring female protagonists
Video games featuring non-playable protagonists
TurboGrafx-CD games
FM Towns games
NEC PC-9801 games
Windows games
Single-player video games